Sultans of Swing: The Very Best of Dire Straits is the second greatest hits compilation by the British rock band Dire Straits, released on 19 October 1998 by Mercury Records internationally, and by Warner Bros. Records in the United States. The album was originally released, featuring liner notes by Robert Sandall, as both a one-disc edition and two-disc edition. The second disc contains live performances. The release is named after the band's 1978 hit single of the same name. The compilation was re-released together with a DVD in 2002. The DVD features the music videos of all the songs on the first disc, in addition to short interviews with Mark Knopfler about each song.

Track listing
All songs were written by Mark Knopfler, except track 4, containing an extract from Rodgers and Hammerstein's Carousel Waltz with the rest of the song by Knopfler, and track 9, written by Knopfler and Sting.
Disc one
"Sultans of Swing" (from Dire Straits, 1978) – 5:50
"Lady Writer" (from Communiqué, 1979) – 3:49
"Romeo and Juliet" (from Making Movies, 1980) – 6:05
"Tunnel of Love" (from Making Movies, 1980) – 8:14
"Private Investigations" (Edited version) (from Love over Gold, 1982) – 5:54
"Twisting by the Pool" (from ExtendedancEPlay, 1983) – 3:36
"Love over Gold" (live, from Alchemy: Dire Straits Live, 1984) – 3:40
"So Far Away" (Edited version) (from Brothers in Arms, 1985) – 4:03
"Money for Nothing" (Radio edit) (from Brothers in Arms, 1985) – 4:09
"Brothers in Arms" (Edited version) (from Brothers in Arms, 1985) – 4:55
"Walk of Life" (from Brothers in Arms, 1985) – 4:12
"Calling Elvis" (Edited version) (from On Every Street, 1991) – 4:41
"Heavy Fuel" (from On Every Street, 1991) – 4:54
"On Every Street" (Edited version) (from On Every Street, 1991) – 4:39
"Your Latest Trick" (live, from On the Night, 1993) – 5:41
"Local Hero/Wild Theme" (live, from On the Night (future DVD version), 2004 and Encores, 1993) – 4:23

Disc two
The following tracks were recorded live at the Royal Albert Hall on 23 May 1996 by Mark Knopfler.
 "Calling Elvis" – 9:05
 "Walk of Life" – 5:28
 "Last Exit to Brooklyn" – 2:23
 "Romeo and Juliet" – 7:30
 "Sultans of Swing" – 13:14
 "Brothers in Arms" – 8:54
 "Money for Nothing" – 6:37

Charts

Weekly charts

Year-end charts

Certifications

References

Dire Straits albums
1998 greatest hits albums
Vertigo Records compilation albums
Warner Records compilation albums
Albums produced by Mark Knopfler
Mercury Records compilation albums